Kiatprawut Saiwaeo (born January 24, 1986), simply known as Car, is a Thai retired professional footballer who played as a defender.

Club career

Manchester City
Kiatprawut was one of three Thai players given trials by Manchester City shortly after former Thailand Prime Minister, Thaksin Shinawatra's takeover of the club in July 2007, prompting suggestions that the moves were made for political rather than footballing reasons. The trio signed contracts in November 2007, but did not come close to making a first team appearance, and lacked work permits due to Thailand's low world ranking. Consequently, Kiatprawut was sent on loan to Belgian club Club Brugge. At the end of the season Manchester City went to Thailand on a promotional tour, where Kiatprawut made his only appearance for Manchester City, a 3–1 defeat in a friendly match against a Thailand XI.

Shortly after the start of the 2008–09 season, Thaksin's controlling stake in Manchester City was bought by the Abu Dhabi United Group. A fortnight later, on 16 October 2008, Kiatprawut was released from Manchester City. He subsequently returned to Chonburi.

International career

Kiatprawut was a Thailand international until 2010. Following appearances for Thailand under-23s, he was included in the senior squad for the 2007 AFC Asian Cup, where he played two matches.

Honours
Thailand U-23
 Sea Games  Gold Medal (1) ; 2003, 2005

References

External links
 Profile at Goal
 

1986 births
Living people
Kiatprawut Saiwaeo
Kiatprawut Saiwaeo
Association football defenders
Kiatprawut Saiwaeo
Manchester City F.C. players
Club Brugge KV players
Kiatprawut Saiwaeo
Kiatprawut Saiwaeo
Belgian Pro League players
Kiatprawut Saiwaeo
Kiatprawut Saiwaeo
Kiatprawut Saiwaeo
Expatriate footballers in England
Expatriate footballers in Belgium
Kiatprawut Saiwaeo
Footballers at the 2006 Asian Games
2007 AFC Asian Cup players
Kiatprawut Saiwaeo
Southeast Asian Games medalists in football
Competitors at the 2005 Southeast Asian Games
Competitors at the 2007 Southeast Asian Games
Kiatprawut Saiwaeo